Jorio, De Jorio and Di Jorio are Italian surnames, and may refer to:

Alberto di Jorio (1884–1979), Italian Roman Catholic cardinal
Andrea De Jorio (1769–1851), Italian antiquarian
Domenico Jorio (1867–1954), Italian Roman Catholic cardinal
Francesco Di Jorio (born 1973), Swiss former footballer
João Jório, Brazilian rower
Maurizio De Jorio (born 1967), Italian singer

See also
 Iorio, another surname

Italian-language surnames